Mutare Airport  is an airport serving Mutare, the fourth largest city in Zimbabwe and the capital of its Manicaland province.

See also
Transport in Zimbabwe
List of airports in Zimbabwe

References

External links
 
 
Mutare Airport
Mutare
OpenStreetMap - Mutare

Airports in Zimbabwe
Buildings and structures in Manicaland Province
Mutare